Cascos are flat-bottomed square-ended barges from the Philippines. They were used mostly to carry cargo along lakes and rivers, and as lighters to transport goods to and from moored ships. Though they resemble the Chinese sampan, they are much larger with two detachable masts with junk rigs made of woven fiber. They also possess outrigger-like platforms along the entire length of the sides, which is used by punters with barge poles when traversing shallow water. They were steered by an oar or a central rudder by a helmsman housed in a small raised platform at the stern. The entire deck is covered almost entirely in removable curving or pitched panels.

Cascos were most prevalent in southern Luzon, particularly along the Pasig River and Laguna de Bay, as well as in the Manila Bay harbor. In the late 18th and early 19th centuries, they were often strung together in a train drawn by a steamship (vapor). They were used as transport ships by American troops in Laguna de Bay during the Philippine–American War. Cascos are still used today in fluvial parades. An example is during the celebrations of Our Lady of Peñafrancia in Naga City, Bicol.

See also

Balangay
Garay
Guilalo
Junk (ship), sailing ships of China
Karakoa, raiding ship of the Visayas
Paraw
Salambaw
Sampan, the Malay and Chinese version of the Casco

References

Indigenous ships of the Philippines